Monstera lentii is a flowering plant in the genus Monstera in the arum family, Araceae.

Distribution 
It is native to Costa Rica, and Panamá.

References 

lentii
Flora of Costa Rica
Flora of Panama
Plants described in 1997